Beckford is a small village on the main Cheltenham to Evesham Road, five miles north-east of Tewkesbury, on the Worcestershire—Gloucestershire border.

The village straddles the A46 and is one of the villages at the foot of Bredon Hill. The Carrant Brook runs between Beckford and Little Beckford and there was a ford across the brook which gave rise to the original name. There is no link between the village of Beckford and the family with the name of Beckford who are considered to be among the original Jamaican slaveowners.

An  intensive poultry unit and market garden lies to the east of the village.  A planning application was made in early 2016 to redevelop this as a retirement settlement with social care facilities.

Beckford Nature Reserve lies immediately north of the village.

History

Railways
Beckford railway station, belonged to the Midland Railway (later part of the LMS), was situated on a lengthy loop line, Gloucester Loop Line, branching off the Birmingham and Gloucester Railway main line at Ashchurch for Tewkesbury railway station, passing through Evesham railway station, Alcester and Redditch, and rejoining the main line at Barnt Green, near Bromsgrove.  
The loop officially closed between Ashchurch and Redditch in June 1963, but trains were replaced by a bus service for the final eight months, since poor condition of the track had brought about withdrawal of all trains between Evesham and Redditch in October 1962.

Villages in Worcestershire